Safarir is a defunct Canadian French-language humour magazine. The name is derived from "safari" and French "ça fait rire", "it makes you laugh". It was in circulation between 1987 and 2016

History and profile
Safarir was established in 1987 by Serge Boisvert deNevers and Sylvain Bolduc. It was published monthly in Quebec City from October 1987 until 2001, and thereafter in Montreal by Éditions Les Artistocrates.

Notable writers and artists who contributed to Safarir included Éric Thériault; and Delaf and Dubuc, whose Les Nombrils was introduced in Safarir in 2004. The magazine ceased publication in July 2016.

See also

Canadian comics
Quebec comics

References

Further reading
 Official website
Mira Falardeau, La bande dessinée au Québec, éditions du Boréal, 1994  
Bernard Dubois, Bande dessinée québécoise : répertoire bibliographique à suivre, éditions D.B.K., 1996 
Michel Viau, BDQ, Répertoire des publications de bandes dessinées au Québec des origines à nos jours, éditions Mille-Îles, 1999 
Mira Falardeau, Histoire de la bande dessinée au Québec, VLB éditeur, 2008 

1987 establishments in Quebec
2016 disestablishments in Quebec
1987 comics debuts
2016 comics endings
Canadian comics titles
Monthly magazines published in Canada
Satirical magazines published in Canada
Defunct magazines published in Canada
French-language magazines published in Canada
Magazines about comics
Magazines established in 1987
Magazines disestablished in 2016
Magazines published in Montreal
Parody comics
Quebec comics
Satirical comics